The Stranger is an American crime thriller web television series created by Veena Sud that debuted on Quibi on April 13, 2020. It was the first production by Touchstone Television, named after the former name of ABC Studios.

Premise

Cast
 Maika Monroe as Clare
 Dane DeHaan as Carl E.
 Avan Jogia as J.J.
 Roxana Brusso as Captain Vasquez

Episodes

References

External links 
 
 
 
 

Quibi original programming
2020s American drama television series
2020 American television series debuts
English-language television shows
American drama web series
Television series by Touchstone Television